Uslybash (Uśılıbaş) is a rural locality (a selo) in Uslinsky Selsoviet, Sterlitamaksky District, Bashkortostan, Russia. The population was 348 as of 2010. There are 6 streets.

Geography 
Uslybash is located 33 km northwest of Sterlitamak (the district's administrative centre) by road. Churtan is the nearest rural locality.

References 

Rural localities in Sterlitamaksky District